The Sion Panvel Expressway is a 25 km Indian highway located entirely in the state of Maharashtra, that connects Sion in Mumbai with Panvel, via Navi Mumbai. It is one of the busiest and most important roads in the Mumbai Metropolitan Region (MMR) and connects Mumbai with the city of Pune. The National Highway 4 and Mumbai-Pune Expressway begin at the eastern end of the expressway, at Kalamboli junction, near Panvel. The highway is also used by vehicles traveling towards Mumbai from Konkan and Goa.

As of September 2014, the stretch of the highway east of Vashi Bridge within the city of Navi Mumbai has been fully widened and concretized to 10 lanes (5 lanes in each direction). New flyovers have been built at Sanpada railway station, Nerul, Uran, and Kamothe. A toll plaza built between Kamothe and Kharghar for recovering the construction cost was controversially opened on January 6, 2015 after much delay as the BJP-led Maharashtra state government admitted that it was not in a position to abolish the toll. Heavy traffic snarls were reported in the initial days as workers of Maharashtra Navnirman Sena vandalized the toll booths. One-way toll for motor vehicles has been set at  40 for cars &  130 for Trucks & Buses.

Major connections
The following major highways cross the Sion Panvel Highway:
Mumbai-Pune Expressway and National Highway 4 at Kalamboli junction
Thane–Belapur road at Turbhe
Palm Beach Marg at Vashi
Mankhurd-Ghatkopar link road at Mankhurd
Eastern Express Highway at Sion

Important destinations
Sion Panvel Highway serves the following nodes of the city of Navi Mumbai.
Vashi
New Panvel
Sanpada
Panvel
Turbhe
Nerul
CBD Belapur
Kharghar
Kamothe
Kalamboli

Sion Panvel Highway serves the following nodes of the city of Mumbai.
Ghatkopar
Chembur
Deonar
Mankhurd
Bhabha Atomic Research Centre

Intersections

Sion-Panvel Highway intersects following important roads.
Palm Beach Marg
Thane Belapur Road
National Highway 48
V. N. Purav Marg
Eastern Express Highway
Eastern Freeway
Ghatkopar-Mankhurd Link Road
Amra Marg

Widening and Concretization 

 The stretch of road from BARC Junction to Kalamboli Junction is about 25 kilometres in length.
 Total Project cost Rs. 825 Crore (Based on DSR of 2006-2007).
 Base Construction cost Rs. 675 Crores.

The project consists of:
 Widening of the existing bituminous road to 5+5 lanes with concrete pavements.
 Central 3+3 lanes to be access controlled.
 The Service roads to be provided whenever required for about 6.29 kilometres.
 Provision of signal free passage for through traffic.
 3 new Flyovers at Kamothe Junction, Sanpada Junction, and Uran Junction.
 Duplication of flyovers at Taloja and Chembur-Mankhurd Link Road junction.
 Pedestrian crossing Underpasses at 10 locations.
 Foot over Bridges at 3 locations.
 Geometric Junction improvements as per standards.
 Toll plaza at Vashi to be upgraded to 8+8 lanes, Toll fee at prescribed rates (current rate) and Toll period to be quoted by BOT Contractor.
 Landscaping / Beautification of entire project corridor including Median plantation, Road side plantation, Landscaping and Beautification below flyovers.
 Renovation / upgradation of existing flyovers, structures.
 Electrification of entire project corridor.
 Operation and Maintenance of Project Facilities up to the end of toll period quoted by BOT Contractor.

Gallery

References 

Transport in Mumbai
Roads in Mumbai
Transport in Panvel
Roads in Maharashtra